Bless the Martyr and Kiss the Child is the debut album by American metalcore band Norma Jean, released on August 13, 2002 by Solid State Records. It is the band's only album to feature bassist Joshua Doolittle and vocalist Josh Scogin, the latter of whom later became the lead vocalist of The Chariot.

Background
The band previously released a studio album, Throwing Myself, under the name of Luti-Kriss. The band changed their name due to keyboardist Mick Bailey and bassist Josh Swafford leaving and also wanted to go in a different musical direction (the band played a nu metal/metalcore hybrid).

Older recordings of the songs "I Used to Hate Cellphones, But Now I Hate Car Accidents" and "The Shotgun Message" were released on a split album with mewithoutYou.

The entire album was recorded live with very few overdubs. The booklet insert claims that the CD was produced entirely without the use of computers.

On the Limited Edition, the song "Pretty Soon, I Don't Know What, but Something Is Going to Happen" features a sample from the 1998 film π, directed by Darren Aronofsky. The song "Face:Face" draws inspiration from Proverbs 30.

Release
The album was released on August 13, 2002 through Solid State Records. Music videos were released for the songs "Memphis Will Be Laid to Waste" and "Face:Face". In the music video for "Memphis Will Be Laid to Waste" it featured touring vocalist Brad Norris and new bassist Jake Schultz instead of Scogin and Doolittle, who had already left the band. Aaron Weiss of mewithoutYou appears on the track "Memphis Will be Laid to Waste" courtesy of Tooth & Nail Records. "Memphis..." had a music video featuring a curious story concept featuring subtitles. It aired on Uranium and Headbangers Ball upon its release.

Reception

Since its release, Bless the Martyr and Kiss the Child has received critical acclaim and is often regarded a landmark in the metalcore genre. Jason D. Taylor of Allmusic awarded the album 4 out of 5 stars. Taylor praised the band's "blast of macabre hardcore/metal" and the production by Adam Dutkiewicz. Mike Rimmer of Cross Rhythms gave the album 9 out of 10, saying it was "an hour of unrelenting guitar noise". Greg Pratt of Exclaim! compared Norma Jean to the likes of Zao and Living Sacrifice, while praising the progressive metalcore sound of the album and said the album is a must for anyone who is a fan of heavy music. Jesusfreakhideout's Andy Kelly said the album signaled "the hardcore revolution" with a "technically and musically astounding offering". Kelly concluded his review by stating "hardcore just does not get much better than this."

Track listing

Personnel 
Norma Jean
 Josh Scogin – Lead vocals
 Christopher Day – Guitar
 Scottie Henry – Guitar, backing vocals
 Joshua Doolittle – Bass
 Daniel Davison – Drums
Additional personnel
 Produced by Adam Dutkiewicz and Norma Jean
 Mastered by Alan Douches
 Additional vocals, Piano, guitar, and tambourine by Aaron Johnathan Weiss
 A&R by Roy Culver
 Photography by David Stuart

Videos
"Memphis Will Be Laid to Waste" 
"Face:Face"

References

Norma Jean (band) albums
2002 debut albums
Solid State Records albums
Albums produced by Adam Dutkiewicz